Chennai Super Kings were one of the eight teams that took part in the 2009 Indian Premier League. They were captained by Indian skipper Mahendra Singh Dhoni for the second season in succession.

Background
Chennai Super Kings had finished as runners-up in the 2008 season of IPL. They had qualified for the 2008 CLT20, but the tournament was cancelled in the aftermath of the 2008 Mumbai attacks.

Pre-season player signings
The Super Kings bought English all-rounder Andrew Flintoff for $1.55 million at the 2009 auction making him the highest-paid IPL cricketer along with English teammate Kevin Pietersen who was bought for the same amount by Royal Challengers Bangalore. Apart from Flintoff, the Chennai Super Kings also bought Murali Vijay, Thilan Thushara and George Bailey. Stephen Fleming, who had decided to retire from all forms of the game after the first season of the IPL, took over as the coach of the Super Kings team from Kepler Wessels. Their batting department was further weakened as Michael Hussey decided to skip the season in order to focus on international cricket ahead of the Ashes.

Squad
Players with international caps before the start of the 2009 IPL season are listed in bold.

Indian Premier League
The Chennai Super Kings were defeated in their first game of the tournament by the Mumbai Indians by 19 runs. Mumbai skipper Sachin Tendulkar scored an unbeaten half-century and fast bowler Lasith Malinga picked up 3/15 in 4 overs. The Super Kings defeated the Royal Challengers Bangalore in their next game by 92 runs, thanks to Matthew Hayden's 65 (35). CSK, however, lost against the Delhi Daredevils by 9 runs at Durban, where Delhi batsman AB de Villiers scored the first century of the season. Hayden, once again starred with the bat as he scored 57 off 27 balls in the same match. After an abandoned game against Kolkata Knight Riders at Cape Town, CSK lost to the Deccan Chargers by 6 wickets, giving the latter their fourth consecutive win of the season. The Super Kings then returned to form by winning their next five games. Riding on Suresh Raina's 98 (55), Chennai beat Rajasthan Royals by 38 runs at SuperSport Park in Centurion. In the next match against the Delhi Daredevils, left-arm spinner Shadab Jakati impressed with figures of 4/24 as he picked up the crucial wickets of Warner, Dilshan and Dinesh Karthik, giving his team an 18-run victory. At East London, the Super Kings beat Deccan Chargers by 78 runs, with skipper MS Dhoni scoring 58* and spinner Jakati taking 4/22 in 4 overs. They won their next game against Kings XI Punjab by 12 runs in an 18-overs-a-side match. CSK opener Matthew Hayden top-scored with 89 (58), a knock that overpowered half-centuries from KXIP's Yuvraj Singh and Simon Katich. With Subramaniam Badrinath scoring an unbeaten fifty, Chennai cruised to their fifth consecutive win, by beating Rajasthan Royals by 7 wickets. Their winning streak came to an end against the Royal Challengers in a low-scoring game at Durban where RCB won the match by two wickets with two balls to spare after Chennai were bundled out for 129 in the first innings. The Super Kings were able to beat the Mumbai Indians at Port Elizabeth by 7 wickets, thanks once again to Hayden who scored another half-century. Despite scoring 188/3 in 20 overs, the Super Kings went down on the last ball of the match to Kolkata Knight Riders, who were helped by fifties from Brendon McCullum and Brad Hodge. In their last league match, the Chennai Super Kings successfully defended a score of 116/9 against Kings XI Punjab. This still remains the record for the lowest successfully defended total in the history of IPL. This win also ended Punjab's chances of reaching the semi-finals.

The Super Kings finished with 17 points from 14 matches and earned a second place at the league table. At the semi-finals, the Super Kings met the Royal Challengers Bangalore who beat them by 6 wickets. CSK put up 146 on the board despite getting a brisk start from the openers. The Challengers chased down the total with 7 balls to spare after Manish Pandey and Rahul Dravid set the platform for the run-chase with scores of 48 and 44 respectively. Matthew Hayden of CSK, who scored 572 runs in 12 innings with 5 half-centuries at an average of 52 and strike-rate of 145, won the Orange Cap for the leading run-scorer of the season. He was also adjudged Player of the Tournament.

Season standings

Match log

Most runs

Most wickets

References

External links

Chennai Super Kings seasons
2009 Indian Premier League